Greatest Hits is a compilation album, the sixth and thus far final album released by A Lighter Shade of Brown. It was released on October 19, 1999 for Thump Records and was produced and arranged by DJ Rectangle, Pebo Rodriguez and Bill Walker.

Track listing
"On a Sunday Afternoon" – 3:47
"Latin Active" – 3:29
"If You Wanna Groove" feat.  NOVELIST – 3:43
"Homies" – 3:31
"Hey DJ" – 3:59
"Dip into My Ride" – 4:37
"Brownies" – 3:36
"Brown & Proud" – 3:45
"Spill the Wine" – 3:46
"Whatever You Want" – 3:58
"T.J. Nights" – 3:28
"Street Life" (DJ Rectangle Remix) – 4:45

A Lighter Shade of Brown albums
1999 greatest hits albums